Schlichter is a German surname. Notable people with the surname include:

Alexander Schlichter (1868–1940), Ukrainian politician
Art Schlichter (born 1960), American football player
John M. Schlichter (born 1958), American politician 
Rudolf Schlichter (1890–1955), German artist 

German-language surnames